Ranabir Samaddar is an Indian political scientist. He holds the Distinguished Chair in Migration and Forced Migration Studies at the Mahanirban Calcutta Research Group. He was a PRIO Global Fellow from 2014–2017.

Studies and early career 
He completed his B.A. in political science from Presidency College (now Presidency University). Thereafter, he proceeded to his M.A. and Ph.D from Calcutta University.

Between 1977 and 1980, he served as a school teacher at the Kishore Bharati Dum Dum School, 24 Paraganas (West Bengal).

He is the founder-editor of the journal, Refugee Watch.

Books 

 Karl Marx and the Postcolonial Age (New York: Palgrave McMillan, 2017) 
 A Postcolonial Enquiry into Europe’s Debt and Migration Crisis (Singapore: Springer, 2016) 
 The Crisis of 1974: The Railway Strike and the Rank and File (Delhi: Primus, 2016)
 Ideas and Frameworks of Governing India (London and New York: Routledge, 2016) 
 Neo-liberal Strategies of Governing India (London and New York: Routledge, 2016)
 Krishna Living with Alzheimer’s (Delhi: Women Unlimited, 2015)
 Passive Revolution in West Bengal – 1977-2011 (New Delhi: Sage, 2013)
 The Nation Form (New Delhi: Sage, 2012) 
 Emergence of the Political Subject (New Delhi: Sage, 2010)
 Politics of Dialogue – Living Under the Geopolitical Histories of War and Peace (Aldershot, UK: Ashgate, 2004)
 In the Time of Nationalism – Political Essays on Bangladesh (Dhaka: University Press Limited, 2002) 
 A Biography of the Indian Nation, 1947-1997 (New Delhi: Sage Publications, 2001)
 Marginal Nation – Trans-border Migration from Bangladesh to India (New Delhi: Sage Publications, 1999)
 Memory, Power, Identity – Politics in Jungle Mahals, West Bengal 1890-1950 (Hyderabad: Orient Longman, 1997; revised edition, 2013))
 Whose Asia Is It Anyway -- Region and the Nation in South Asia (Calcutta: MaulanaAbulKalam Azad Institute of Asian Studies and Pearl Publishers, 1996)
 Workers and Automation -- The Impact of New Technology on the Newspaper Industry (New Delhi: Sage Publications)

References 

1949 births
Living people
Indian political scientists
Bengali people